Public Transport Victoria (PTV) is the brand name for public transport in the Australian state of Victoria. It was the trading name of the Public Transport Development Authority (PTDA), a now-defunct statutory authority in Victoria, responsible for providing, coordinating, and promoting public transport.

The PTV began operating on 2 April 2012, taking over many of the responsibilities previously exercised by the Director of Public Transport and the Department of Transport. It also took over the marketing of public transport in Victoria from Metlink and Viclink, as well as responsibility for the myki ticketing system, formerly handled by the Transport Ticketing Authority.

PTV's functions were transferred to the Department of Transport on 1 July 2019. However, PTV continues to exist as the brand for public transport services in Victoria.

Governance
PTV is the trading name of the Public Transport Development Authority (PTDA). The PTDA was established by the Transport Legislation Amendment (Public Transport Development Authority) Act 2011, passed by the Parliament of Victoria in November 2011, which positioned the agency under the State's primary transport statute, the Transport Integration Act. The legislation provides that the "...primary object of the Public Transport Development Authority is to plan, coordinate, provide, operate and maintain a safe, punctual, reliable and clean public transport system....".

Key functions

Government expectations
In introducing the legislation, the then Minister for Public Transport, Terry Mulder, observed that:

"This bill is an essential step to fix the problems in Victoria's public transport system. The bill establishes a new statutory authority, the Public Transport Development Authority (PTDA), to plan, coordinate and manage all metropolitan and regional train, tram, and bus services.

The PTDA will focus on the basics of a good public transport system.

It will be responsible and accountable for achieving significant improvement in the reliability, efficiency, and integration of public transport services across the state.

In a key change of focus, the new authority will put passengers first.

It will operate as the face of public transport, providing a single shopfront for passengers and stakeholders.

No longer will Victorians have to endure the confusion, the blame shifting, and the frustration that characterised the state's troubled public transport system over the previous decade."

Contracting activities with train, tram, and bus operators
PTV enters into contracts with transport operators on behalf of the State to provide train, tram, and bus services throughout Victoria. The key franchise contracts which were transferred to PTV from the former Director of Public Transport relate to:

Trains in Melbourne (contract with Metro Trains Melbourne) – covering suburban rail services in Melbourne.
Trams in Melbourne (with Keolis Downer) – covering suburban tram and light rail services in Melbourne.
Trains in regional Victoria (with V/Line Corporation) – covering train services in country Victoria.
Bus services in Melbourne and throughout Victoria, including school bus services involving a large number of bus operators, and their umbrella body, the Bus Association of Victoria.

VicTrack, the custodian of all rail infrastructure and assets in Victoria, leases the metropolitan train and tram infrastructure and assets to PTV through the Metropolitan Infrastructure Head Lease. PTV then sub-leases the assets to the metropolitan train and tram operators through Infrastructure Leases. PTV manages the rights and obligations contained in these leases on behalf of the State. PTV also enters into franchise agreements with the metropolitan train and tram operators that govern the provision of public transport services. The franchise agreements specify a range of operational and service requirements administered and managed by PTV.

Regional rail services operated by V/Line Corporation are subject to similar arrangements involving VicTrack and PTV. VicTrack leases the regional rail infrastructure and assets to PTV which then sub-leases them to V/Line under the Regional Infrastructure Lease. Similarly, PTV and V/Line have entered into a franchise agreement that governs the operational and service requirements for regional rail services.

PTV's position in the transport portfolio
PTV is one of the statutory agencies in the Victorian transport portfolio whose activities are coordinated by the Department of Transport. These agencies can be divided into three main types: statutory offices, statutory authorities, and independent transport safety agencies.

Together with the DoT, the agencies provide, manage, and regulate transport system activities in Victoria including:
heavy and light rail systems including trains and trams
roads systems and vehicles including cars, trucks, and bicycles
ports and waterways including commercial ships and recreational vessels
some air transport systems.

Key people
The inaugural chairman and chief executive officer (CEO) of PTV was Ian Dobbs, who had headed the former Victorian Public Transport Corporation between 1993 and 1998. On 1 February 2014, the positions of chairman and CEO were split, as provided for in the original legislation, and Mark Wild was appointed CEO of PTV, with Dobbs remaining as chairman until his appointment was not renewed.  Mark Wild resigned as CEO following several network failures in January 2016, and Jeroen Weimar took over as Acting CEO and was appointed to a full-time position in September 2016. He remained CEO until the functions of PTV were absorbed into the Department of Transport in 2019.

PTV also had its own Board, including a community representative. The board was disbanded in 2018, and an executive board replaced it until the functions of PTV passed to the Department of Transport.

Authorised officers
Authorised officers perform a ticket inspection role across the public transport network and have special powers on buses, trains, and trams, as well as at public transport stops and stations. They have the authority to ask to see a passenger's ticket or concession card and to confiscate tickets for use as evidence or in some cases other items.  If they reasonably believe an offence has occurred, they have the authority to ask for a passenger's name, address, and proof of identity, and they can make a report to the Department of Transport and may issue a fine to the offender. Authorised officers can also arrest passengers in some circumstances but cannot use unnecessary force.

The conduct of some authorised officers has been the subject of public concern due to complaints about the excessive use of force. In 2013, a 15-year-old girl was picked up and tackled after assaulting two officers due to being stopped over a ticketing offence. There were 220 formal complaints about authorised officers in the 2013 financial year, compared with 138 a year earlier.

Abolition
The PTV ceased to exist as an independent entity on 30 June 2019 and merged with VicRoads as part of the creation of the new Department of Transport. A transport branding strategy was proposed to be completed before the merge took effect, but no re-branding had been announced by mid-2020. PTV continues to be the brand of public transport services in Victoria.

See also

Transport in Australia
Rail transport in Victoria
Railways in Melbourne
Roads in Victoria
Trams in Melbourne
Public Transport Corporation

References

External links
PTV website
PTV Journey Planner
• Department of Transport

• Bus Association Victoria

Government agencies established in 2012
Government agencies disestablished in 2019
Intermodal transport authorities in Australia
Public transport in Melbourne
Transport in Victoria (Australia)
2012 establishments in Australia
2019 disestablishments in Australia